The Pernarava-Šaravai Forest is a forest in Kėdainiai District Municipality, central Lithuania, located  west from Josvainiai. It consists of smaller forests: the Šaravai Forest, the Sviliai Forest, the Pernarava Forest, the Juodgiris. Most of the forest is drained by the Šušvė tributaries (the Liedas, the Vikšrupis, the Putnupys) while the western part is drained by the Aluona and its tributary the Sakuona.

As of 2005, 50 % of the area was covered by birch, 20 % by spruce, 8 % by aspen, 8 % by ash, 4 % by oak, 9 % by black alder, 1 % by white alder tree groups. The fauna of the forest consists of wild boar, roe deer, moose, red fox, raccoon dog, pine marten, badger, hare, squirrel, beaver, muskrat, also there are hazel grouses, black storks, Eurasian woodcocks, lesser spotted eagles, northern goshawks. A part of the forest belongs to the Pavikšrupys Botanical Zoological Sanctuary. There is a nature monument the Šaravai Oak Tree in the Šaravai Forest.

There are Pavikšrupys, Sviliai, Sviliukai, Degimai, Rugėnai, Būdai, Graužiai, Skaistgiriai, Šaravai, Paaluonys, Vincentava, Kantrimas. villages inside the forest or on its edges.

Images

References

Forests of Lithuania
Kėdainiai District Municipality